Víctor Javier Cáceres Centurión (born 25 March 1985) is a Paraguayan footballer. He currently plays as defensive midfielder for Club Guaraní and also for Paraguay national team.

Club career
Víctor Cáceres begins his career at the age of 13 in the Escuela de fútbol de la Asociación Mutual del Personal de la Administración Nacional de Electricidad (Ampande), located in the Santísima Trinidad neighborhood of the capital of the country, Asunción.

Cáceres debuted for Atlántida Asunción in 2002 in Paraguay's 3rd division. Cáceres continued his career in the youth divisions of Atlántida SC where he played until the age of 18, moving to the youth divisions of Libertad and making his professional debut with the team at the age of 21. Slowly, he settled in the first team and eventually became a key player, helping the team win the league and becoming part of the Paraguay national team.

Flamengo
In July 2012 at the end of his contract with Libertad Víctor signed with Brazilian Série A club Flamengo on a free transfer. He took almost a month to be able to play due to contractual problems with his former club. Víctor debuted for Flamengo on 9 August 2012 in a 2x0 win against Figueirense at Orlando Scarpelli Stadium.

12 de Octubre
At 12 de Octubre, Caceres summoned 1, 706 minutes in 21 games for the club. 19 of the games were in the starting 11.

Guaraní
In July 2021, Caceres joined Club Guaraní on a free-transfer. He joined the club with his brother, Marcos Caceres.

Career statistics
(Correct )

International career

International goals
Scores and results list Paraguay's goal tally first.

Honours
Libertad
Paraguayan Primera División: 2006, 2007, 2008 Apertura, 2008 Clausura

Flamengo
Copa do Brasil: 2013
Campeonato Carioca: 2014

References

External links

1985 births
Living people
Paraguayan footballers
Paraguayan expatriate footballers
Club Libertad footballers
Al-Rayyan SC players
Campeonato Brasileiro Série A players
CR Flamengo footballers
Paraguay international footballers
2010 FIFA World Cup players
2011 Copa América players
2015 Copa América players
Sportspeople from Asunción
Paraguayan expatriate sportspeople in Brazil
Expatriate footballers in Brazil
Association football midfielders
Qatar Stars League players
Cerro Porteño players
21st-century Paraguayan people
20th-century Paraguayan people